William Henry Baker (January 17, 1827 – November 25, 1911) was an American politician and a U.S. Representative from New York.

Biography
Born in Lenox, New York, Baker moved with his parents to Oswego County in 1829 and attended the common schools, then Red Creek and Mexico Academies. He studied law and was admitted to the bar in Syracuse, New York, in November 1851 and commenced practice in Cleveland, New York.

Career
Baker moved to Constantia, New York, in 1853, and served as district attorney for Oswego County from January 1863 to January 1870.

Elected as a Republican to the Forty-fourth and Forty-fifth Congresses, Baker served as U.S. Representative for the twenty-fourth district of New York from March 4, 1875 to March 3, 1879.

Declining to be a candidate for renomination in 1878, Baker resumed his practice and was a delegate to the State constitutional conventions in 1884 and 1894. He also engaged in agricultural pursuits.

Death
Baker died in Constantia, New York, on November 25, 1911 (age 84 years, 312 days). He is interred at Trinity Church Cemetery.

References

External links

1827 births
1911 deaths
Republican Party members of the United States House of Representatives from New York (state)
People from Oswego County, New York
People from Lenox, New York
Burials at Trinity Church Cemetery
19th-century American politicians
Oswego County District Attorneys